Top Country Albums is a chart that ranks the top-performing country music albums in the United States, published by Billboard.  The magazine had published an overall albums chart since 1945, but a chart specifically for country albums was not launched until the issue dated January 11, 1964.  During the remainder of the year, nine different albums topped the chart, which was at the time published under the title Hot Country Albums, based on sales reports submitted by a representative sample of stores nationwide.

The number-one album on the first published chart was the compilation album Ring of Fire: The Best of Johnny Cash by Johnny Cash.  After a single week in the top spot it was displaced by Night Life by Ray Price.  Cash's album returned to the top of the chart, however, in the issue of Billboard dated February 8 and remained there for 13 consecutive weeks, the year's longest unbroken run at number one.  Cash achieved a second chart-topper in August with I Walk the Line, and the total of 18 weeks which he spent atop the chart was the most by any artist in 1964.  Cash is regarded as one of the most influential and successful country music artists of all time and his recording career spanned six decades, but his success on the albums chart was largely confined to the 1960s; after 1971 he would not achieve another number one until after his 2003 death.

In addition to Cash, two other vocalists achieved two chart-topping albums in 1964.  Buck Owens spent two weeks at number one in January and February with Buck Owens Sings Tommy Collins and six weeks atop the chart with Together Again/My Heart Skips a Beat, which was the year's final chart-topper.  Owens was one of the biggest stars in country music in the mid-1960s, achieving a run of 15 consecutive chart-toppers on the Hot Country Singles chart between 1963 and 1967.  Jim Reeves spent eight weeks at number one on the albums listing beginning in the issue of Billboard dated July 4 with Moonlight and Roses and the same amount of time in the top spot with The Best of Jim Reeves beginning in the issue dated September 26.  Moonlight and Roses was at number one when Reeves died in an aviation accident on July 31.  The Best of Jim Reeves also entered the top 10 of Billboards all-genre albums chart, at the time known as Top LPs, his only release to do so.  On the country albums chart he would go on to achieve many more posthumous top 10 hits.  Every album to reach number one in 1964 was by a male vocalist; it would not be until July 1965 that an album by a female artist would top the chart for the first time.

Chart history

References

1964-related lists
1964
1964 record charts